Keith Frank Kettleborough (29 June 1935 – 2 November 2009) was an English professional footballer born in Rotherham, Yorkshire, who made more than 400 appearances in the Football League playing for Rotherham United, Sheffield United, Newcastle United, Doncaster Rovers and Chesterfield.

Kettleborough started his football career with Rotherham Y.M.C.A. and after a trial with Grimsby Town he turned professional with his home town club of Rotherham United, for whom he made his debut during the 1955–56 season. It took him two years to win a regular place at inside forward.

Sheffield United signed him in December 1960, but it was not until the following season that he earned a regular place in the first team. In five years with the Blades in the First Division he made 154 league appearances and scored 65 goals. In December 1965, he signed for Newcastle United, but only made 30 starts for the Magpies before transferring to Doncaster Rovers a year later, where he spent a short time as manager. In November 1967, he joined Chesterfield where he completed his Football League career. 

Kettleborough died on 2 November 2009 in Rotherham. A minute's applause was observed before that day's match between Sheffield United and Newcastle United.

References

1935 births
2009 deaths
Footballers from Rotherham
English footballers
Association football inside forwards
Rotherham United F.C. players
Sheffield United F.C. players
Newcastle United F.C. players
Doncaster Rovers F.C. players
Chesterfield F.C. players
English football managers
Doncaster Rovers F.C. managers
English Football League players
English Football League managers